Prejish Prakash (both 24 February 1986) is an Indian film editor working primarily in Malayalam cinema. He is also a web designer and an entrepreneur. 
Other than feature-film editing he edited various documentaries, advertisements, Corporate videos, Film trailers etc. in his career.

Early life and education 
Prejish Prakash was born on 24 February 1986 in Pathanamthitta to a Christian family. He did his schooling from Mount Bethany EHSS, and graduate with a degree in Multimedia from St Joseph College of Communication in 2007.

Editing career 
He began his editing career by joining Yes indiavision Satellite Communications as a video editor in 2008. His passion for movies and film editing lead him to step into the film industry. He worked as an associate editor with the editors VT Sreejith and Arun Kumar Aravind  in various movies.

Prejish started working as an independent film editor in the film Mullassery Madhavan Kutty Nemom P. O. in 2012.

In 2013, Prejish edited the movie Philips and the monkey pen which completed 111 days in theaters and was a huge commercial success at the box-office. This film also won the Kerala State Film Award for Best Children's Film, Kerala State Film Award for Best Child Artist and Kerala State Film Award for Best Children's Film Director.

Movie vedivazhipadu 2013 was his next editorial venture which was the maiden production venture of Arun Kumar Aravind. Prejish edited the psychological thriller movie 1 by Two in 2014 directed by Arun Kumar Aravind and written by Jeyamohan

He is the founder of the firm Peppino Studios & School Of editing which started in 2015. Peppino is a creative studio offers services in the field of Editing & Web design where the School of Editing offers Digital Film & Video Editing courses in Kochi.

Filmography

Film Editor

Promo Editor (Trailer) & Associate Editor

Documentary editor
He edited the documentary "After Life" directed by Sanjeev Sivan, which was based on a real-life incident of a couple of Kerala fighting a legal battle to get access to their dead son's semen in hopes of producing an heir.

"Water Whatever" is another Documentary Film edited by Prejish which has become an official selection of the Stockholm Project Green festival is one of only seven films selected worldwide by festival co-hosts Nomad Films (US) and Sweden's GAP (Global Action Plan) The 35mm film recounts 3 stories based on a single theme, water scarcity. Directed by Sudip Joshiy, Shot in Ladakh, Rajasthan and Kerala by renowned cinematographer Amal Neerad

Awards

References

External links 
 

Film editors from Kerala
Malayalam film editors
1986 births
Living people
People from Pathanamthitta